The Chiba clan (千葉氏 Chiba-shi) was a Japanese gōzoku and samurai family descending from the Taira clan. The clan was founded by Chiba Tsunetane, the son of Taira no Tadatsune. The Chiba governed in Shimōsa Province, and the clan was based in present-day Chiba City. Additionally, for a period, the clan controlled the Sōma Manor that extended into present-day Ibaraki. After the establishment of the Kamakura shogunate, the head of the Chiba clan became the hereditary shugo governor of Shimōsa Province.

Origin 

The Chiba clan descends from the 8th century Emperor Kanmu through the sequence of Imperial Prince Kazurahara (786-853) — Prince Takami — Taira no Takamochi — Muraoka Yoshifumi — Muraoka Tadayori — Chiba Tadatsune  — Chiba Tsunemasa — Chiba Tsunenaga — Chiba Tsunekane — Chiba Tsuneshige — Chiba Tsunetane — Azuma Taneyori . The Emperor Go-Daigo authorized the head of Chiba family, Chiba Sadatane, as chief daimyō and samurai of the Kantō region. The clan settled in the Shimōsa area in the early 12th century. The Chiba came into conflict with Minamoto no Yoshitomo during the 1140s over estates in present-day Chiba Prefecture. The Chiba, however, came to support Yoshitomo in the Hōgen Rebellion (1156).

Genpei War 
During the Genpei War (1180–1185) the Chiba clan, as well as the Hōjō, Miura, and Doi clans, opposed the greater 'core' Taira clan and supported Minamoto no Yoritomo. Chiba Tsunetane, clan chief of the period, won Yoritomo’s trust and helped establish the Kamakura shogunate. The power of the clan increased in this period, but ultimately declined during the Muromachi period (1336–1573).

Later history 
The Chiba clan was completely conquered by Toyotomi Hideyoshi before the establishment of the Tokugawa shogunate. Many descendants of the Chiba clan live in Chiba Prefecture today. Chiba Castle, reconstructed in 1967, is built on the site of Inohana Castle, a fortification of the clan.

References 

Taira clan